Nerol is a monoterpenoid alcohol found in many essential oils such as lemongrass and hops. It was originally isolated from neroli oil, hence its name. This colourless liquid is used in perfumery. Like geraniol, nerol has a sweet rose odor but it is considered to be fresher.  Esters and related derivatives of nerol are referred to as neryl, e.g., neryl acetate.

Isomeric with nerol is geraniol, which is trans- or E-isomer. Nerol readily loses water to form a set of C10 compounds called dipentene. Nerol can be synthesized by pyrolysis of beta-pinene, which also affords myrcene. Hydrochlorination of myrcene gives a series of isomeric chlorides.

See also
Citral
Citronellol
Geraniol
Linalool
Perfume allergy

References

Primary alcohols
Alkene derivatives
Perfume ingredients
Flavors
Monoterpenes
Sweet-smelling chemicals